The "Class of 9/11" is a term coined by National Public Radio for American high school graduating classes of 2005. These students were freshmen when the  September 11 attacks occurred in 2001, and have had to cope with the many aspects of the aftermath during teenage life and high school. The Class of 2002 can also be considered the Class of 9/11.

This term is now used mainly for the 2005 graduating class of West Point, which contained 911 students.  According to the Associated Press report the graduating cadets were told they were "a special group forged by historic events".

On September 12, 2006, the first member of the class was killed. 2nd Lt. Emily Perez, a Medical Service Corps officer with the 204th Support Battalion, 2nd Brigade, 4th Infantry Division, was leading a platoon when a roadside bomb exploded, killing her. Perez, who had been the highest-ranking black and Hispanic woman in the Academy's history, was the first female West Point graduate to die in Iraq.

References

External links
 

United States Military Academy
Aftermath of the September 11 attacks
History of education in the United States